U.S. Route 43 (US 43) is a  north–south United States Highway in the Southern states of Alabama and Tennessee. It travels from Prichard, Alabama, to Columbia, Tennessee. The highway's southern terminus is in Prichard, at an intersection with US 90, and its northern terminus is in Columbia at an intersection with US 31/US 412/US 412 Bus.

In Alabama and Tennessee, all of the U.S. Highways in each state have one or more unsigned state highways designated along its length. US 43 travels concurrently with Alabama State Route 13 (SR 13) from its southern terminus to an intersection in southeastern Fayette County. For the rest of its length in the state, US 43 is concurrent with signed state highways. In Tennessee, US 43 travels concurrently with Tennessee State Route 6 (SR 6) along its entire length in the state. It also has an unsigned concurrency with SR 227 between Saint Joseph and Loretto.

Route description

Alabama
US 43 begins along Telegraph Road in Prichard, Alabama, at the point where US 90 crosses over Telegraph Road; a short connector road joins the two highways nearby.  It travels northward toward Chickasaw on a three-lane road that features one lane in each direction and a center turning lane.  Upon intersecting the Craft Highway in Chickasaw, the roadway adds another lane in each direction.  As it enters Saraland, the highway meets State Route 158 (SR 158), which connects to Interstate 65 (I-65) to the west.  Farther north in the town, it meets SR 213.  It continues north and then crosses I-65 on the northern edge of Satsuma.  US 43 continues north on a four-lane divided highway that runs roughly parallel to the meandering Mobile River.  A trumpet interchange near Calvert provides access to a steel mill between the highway and the river.  In McIntosh, the highway passes Andrews Chapel, a historic log church.  North of McIntosh, the highway runs through forest land; clearings dot the roadside occasionally.  At Wagarville, the highway intersects SR 56, which travels west toward Chatom.  Near Jackson, the road crosses the Tombigbee River just before an intersection with SR 177.  SR 177 serves as a business route for US 43 as it passes through downtown Jackson.  A connector road on either side of US 43 links the highway to SR 69, which passes over the four-lane road.  SR 177 intersects US 43 again as it leaves Jackson.  US 43 curves to the northeast as it heads toward Grove Hill.  There, SR 295 splits off to the east and passes through the town.  Shortly thereafter, the highway meets US 84 at a diamond interchange.  SR 295 rejoins US 43 on the northern end of Grove Hill.  Roughly halfway between Grove Hill and Thomasville, SR 178 connects Fulton to the highway system.  Near the center of Thomasville, the road meets SR 154, which heads southwest toward Coffeeville.  In northern Thomasville, US 43 splits away from the roadway, which continues as SR 5.  Instead, US 43 heads northwesterly until it intersects SR 10 at Dixons Mills.

US 43 continues northward from Dixons Mills along a winding road that leads to Linden.  There, it meets SR 69, which came from the southwest.  The two highways travel together through Linden, where they are overlapped briefly by SR 28.  When the highways reach Providence, the two roads fork and US 43 takes the western leg; SR 69 heads north toward Greensboro.  It then curves slightly to the northwest and meets US 80 in southeastern Demopolis.  The two routes head west together for about  before US 43 turns back to the north.  The highway passes by the town square and in between the Tombigbee and Black Warrior Rivers before crossing the latter.  North of Demopolis, it follows a two-lane road that passes through wooded farmland that clears as the road goes north.  When the highway reaches Eutaw, it joins up with SR 14, which comes from Greensboro to the southeast.  In the middle of town, the two routes meet northbound U.S. Route 11 in Alabama at the Greene County Courthouse Square District; southbound US 11 goes around the other side of the block, effectively making the courthouse square its median.  The three routes only share one block before SR 14 departs to the west and the other two routes head in the opposite direction.  Outside of Eutaw, the roadway curves around to the north and it runs a parallel course to I-20/I-59, though a few miles offset.  At Knoxville, the two U.S. Highways cross over the two Interstate Highways, after which, US 43 and US 11 travel on the north side of the interstates until reaching Tuscaloosa.  In southwestern Tuscaloosa, the two highways cross the Joe Mallisham Parkway, which serves as a western bypass of Tuscaloosa and Northport.  Just south of downtown Tuscaloosa, US 43 and US 11 diverge at an interchange with SR 69, which also happens to be the northern end of I-359.  SR 69 descends from the elevated highway and joins US 43 on Lurleen B. Wallace Parkway through the downtown area and past the historic Bama Theatre.  The northbound and southbound lanes are separated by a block until they join to cross the Black Warrior River on the Hugh R. Thomas Bridge just above the Oliver Dam and then enter Northport.  Shortly after crossing the river is an interchange with 5th Street.  The highways ease to the north and continue until reaching US 82.  There, SR 69 continues to the north while US 43 turns west onto US 82.  These two highways head west for a short distance before US 43 turns away to the northwest.  The highway curves back around to head northeast as it intersects SR 171.  Farther north in Northport, US 43 meets the end of the Tuscaloosa–Northport western bypass.

It crosses over an arm of Lake Tuscaloosa and travels along the western edge of Binion Creek Landing Park.  It winds to the north-northwest and intersects SR 18.  At this intersection, US 43 ends its southern concurrency with SR 13 and begins a concurrency with SR 18.  Also, SR 13 becomes a signed highway at this intersection.  US 43 and SR 18 wind to the north-northeast and enter Bankston and later pass through Stough.  Approximately  after crossing the Sipsey River the highways enter Fayette where they intersect SR 171 (2nd Avenue Southeast) in the downtown area.  At this intersection, SR 18 continues to the west-northwest on Columbus Street West and US 43 and SR 171 travel to the north-northeast on 2nd Avenue Northeast.  North of Fayette, the two highways intersect the southern terminus of SR 129 and the western terminus of SR 102 shortly thereafter.  They curve to the north-northwest and then briefly travel through the Fayette State Experiment Forest.  The highways curve to the north-northeast and enter Winfield.  They cross over some railroad tracks of BNSF Railway before intersecting SR 118 (Bankhead Highway) and the southern terminus of SR 253.  US 43, SR 118, and SR 171 travel concurrently to the northwest toward Gu-Win and Guin.  They pass a 3M plant before they intersect the western terminus of SR 44 (7th Street) in Guin.  The highways intersect US 278 (unsigned SR 74) and the eastern terminus of SR 142 (11th Avenue West) in downtown Guin.  At this intersection, SR 118 turns south onto US 278 west, and US 43 and SR 171 turn north onto US 278 east; the three highways travel to the north-northwest.  Between Guin and Hamilton, they have an interchange with I-22/US 78.  They cross over the Buttahatchee River as they enter Hamilton.  They intersect SR 17 south of the downtown area.  At this intersection, SR 171 ends and SR 17 joins the US 43/US 278 concurrency.  At Bexar Avenue West, US 278 turns east, while US 43 and SR 17 continue to the north.  The highways curve back to the northeast and intersect the southern terminus of SR 187.  They enter Hackleburg and in the main part of town is an intersection with SR 172 and the southern terminus of SR 253 (Clay Street).  They then continue to the north and intersect SR 13 for a second time northwest of Phil Campbell.  They enter Russellville and have an interchange with SR 24.

The three highways head to the north and pass the King Drive-In theater, the oldest, continually-operating theater in the state.  They travel northeast through Littleville and then northwest towards Tuscumbia.  They have an intersection with US 72 (unsigned SR 2), US 72 Alt., and SR 20.  At this intersection, US 72 Alternate ends, while US 72 and SR 20 join the US 43/SR 13/SR 17 concurrency.  The five highways continue to the north, briefly travel through Tuscumbia proper before traveling along the Tuscumbia–Muscle Shoals city line.  On the Muscle Shoals–Sheffield city line, the highways intersect East 2nd Street, which carries SR 184 east of the intersection.  They then pass administration offices of the Tennessee Valley Authority (TVA).  Then, they cross over the Tennessee River on the O'Neal Bridge and enter Lauderdale County.  The US 43/US 72/SR 13/SR 17/SR 20 concurrency immediately enters Florence.  It has an incomplete interchange where SR 20 leaves the concurrency to the west-southwest on Coffee Road.  There is no direct access from SR 20 to US 43 north/US 72 east/SR 13 north/SR 17 north.  The highways pass near University of North Alabama's main campus and travel to the northeast.  There is an interchange with SR 157 (Helton Drive).  At this interchange, SR 17 departs the concurrency and heads northwest with SR 157.  After that, they intersect SR 133 (Cox Creek Parkway).  Just west-southwest of Killen, US 72 continues to the east-northeast, while US 43 and SR 13 head to the northeast.  US 43 and SR 13 curve to the north and intersect SR 64.  They continue to the north and east until they reach the Tennessee state line, where SR 13 ends.

Tennessee
US 43 enters Lawrence County and the city limits of Saint Joseph. The unsigned State Route 6 (SR 6) begins at the state line. In the main part of the city, US 43 begins an unsigned concurrency with SR 227 (Iron City Road). They curve to the northeast, leave Saint Joseph, and enter Loretto. There, SR 227 splits off to the southeast onto East Main Street. Then, US 43 intersects SR 98 (Rabbit Trail Road) in Leoma. It has an interchange with US 64 (unsigned SR 15; Lawrenceburg Highway) in Lawrenceburg. In downtown Lawrenceburg, US 43 intersects US 64 Bus. (Gaines Street). The highway briefly parallels the North Fork Buffalo River before beginning a curve to the north and crossing that river twice. Then, US 43 intersects SR 240 (Monument Road) and Spring Water Drive.

In Maury County, US 43 intersects SR 20. It intersects the southern terminus of SR 243 (South Main Street) in Mount Pleasant. It travels on an overpass over Mt. Joy Road and some railroad tracks. US 43 bypasses downtown by traveling through the western part of the city. It intersects SR 166 (1st Avenue). Then, it has an interchange with SR 243, which also leads to the Maury County Airport. It has an interchange with US 412 (unsigned SR 99) and the western terminus of US 412 Bus. (Hampshire Pike) in Columbia. At this interchange, US 43 and US 412 travel concurrently to the north-northeast. At an interchange with SR 50 (Williamsport Pike), the concurrency briefly re-enters the city before leaving again. The concurrency curves to the east-southeast and has an interchange with SR 7 (Santa Fe Pike). Then, they intersect US 31 and US 412 Bus (Nashville Highway). Here, US 43 ends, US 412 continues to the east-southeast on Bear Creek Pike, and SR 6 turns onto US 31 north.

History
Prior to the completion of Corridor X in western Alabama, US 43 and US 278 shared a concurrency with US 78 between Guin and Hamilton. 

1934 proposed expansion

In 1934 as part of a proposal to eliminate the US 31W and US 31E spilt, US 43 was to be extended north to Hopkinsville, Kentucky on US 31 and modern day US 41A. An auxiliary route numbered US 143 was also to be commissioned to replace US 31E to Glasgow, Kentucky. This plan received pushback from the Tennessee and Kentucky Departments of Transportation and the plan was scrapped.

Future
Preliminary talks have indicated that Alabama state officials support a plan to upgrade US 43 to Interstate Highway standards from the Mobile metropolitan area to the I-20/I-59 interchange in Knoxville, Alabama (southwest of Tuscaloosa). No number has been assigned. The plan is estimated to cost roughly $1.6 billion. The project is expected to help the economies of cities in the Black Belt by connecting communities in western Alabama, the Port of Mobile, I-65, and I-20/I-59.

Major intersections

See also 

 U.S. Route 143

Notes

References

External links 

 U.S. Highway 43 (AL) on AARoads.com
 U.S. Highway 43 endpoints on USEnds.com
 U.S. Highway 43 on the Lost Highway – Shows pictures of old segments of US 43
 Interstate 63/Western Alabama North-South Freeway on Interstate-Guide.com

 
43
43
Transportation in Mobile County, Alabama
Transportation in Washington County, Alabama
Transportation in Clarke County, Alabama
Transportation in Marengo County, Alabama
Transportation in Greene County, Alabama
Transportation in Tuscaloosa County, Alabama
Transportation in Fayette County, Alabama
Transportation in Marion County, Alabama
Transportation in Franklin County, Alabama
Transportation in Colbert County, Alabama
Transportation in Lauderdale County, Alabama
Transportation in Lawrence County, Tennessee
Transportation in Maury County, Tennessee
Mobile metropolitan area
Demopolis, Alabama
Transportation in Tuscaloosa, Alabama
Florence–Muscle Shoals metropolitan area
43
43